Göhr (also spelled as Goehr or Gohr) is a surname of German language origin. Notable people with this name include:

Goehr
 Alexander Goehr (born 1932), English composer and academic, son of Walter
 Lydia Goehr (born 1960), English philosopher
 Walter Goehr (1903-1960), German composer, father of Alexander

Gohr
 Arnold Gohr (1896–1983), German trade unionist, activist, and politician
 Else Schmitz-Gohr (1901-1987) German composer and pianist
 Greg Gohr (born 1967), American baseball pitcher

Göhr
 Marlies Göhr (born 1958), German athlete

German-language surnames